The European Environmental Press (EEP) is a Europe-wide association of over a dozen environmental magazines  with a combined circulation of 800,000. Each member is considered to be the leader in its country and is committed to building links between 400,000 environmental professionals across Europe in both the public and private sectors. The EEP brings together the leading national business-to-business magazines as an expert network for the dissemination of high-quality environmental information throughout Europe. The target market for EEP is highly educated individuals. It deals with various environmental issues, including water supply, waste management, recycling, remediation of contaminated land, air pollution, noise, energy, and tracking technologies, as well as environmental administration. The magazine is highly technologically optimistic and has focused on many technological solutions to environmental problems.

The European Environmental Press presents various companies with awards that relate to creating efficient solutions to environmental problems as well as to efforts to reduce pollution and contribute to bettering the environment. They do this in association with Pollutec, a French trade-show company that is endorsed by the European Network of Environmental Professionals (EFAP). Applications are announced and accepted from anyone. A committee then gathers and nominates ten winners from the applicant pool. The committee then decides the winners from the nominated ten. There are three winners - one gold, one silver, and one bronze. The gold winners receive spreads in the EEP magazines, along with the opportunity to present their projects at various conferences across Europe, the most important one being Pollutec. Being nominated but not winning can also be beneficial, as nominated applicants are often cited in the magazine.

China and the European Environmental Press 
The Guardian and the EEP collaborated in May 2010 in recognizing China's efforts at reducing pollution and taking steps towards a more sustainable future. This was also a journalism event, honoring journalists who were doing new and thorough investigations of the country's environment.

Ekoloji Magazin from Turkey used to be published in the EEP often in the early 2000s, as well as Spanish TIASA - Tecno Ambiente

See also
	
 Association of Environmental Professionals
 Conservation biology
 Conservation ethic
 Conservation movement
 Ecology
 Ecology movement
 Environmentalism
 Environmental movement
 Environmental protection
 Habitat conservation
 Natural environment
 Natural capital
 Natural resource
 Renewable resource
 Sustainable development
 Sustainability

References

External links
 EEP Web Page

Magazine publishing